Limnephilini is a tribe of northern caddisflies in the family Limnephilidae. There are about 16 genera and at least 300 described species in Limnephilini.

The type genus for Limnephilini is Limnephilus Leach, 1815.

Genera
These 19 genera belong to the tribe Limnephilini:

 Anabolia Stephens, 1837
 Anisogamodes Martynov, 1924
 Arctopora Thomson, 1891
 Asynarchus McLachlan, 1880
 Clistoronia Banks, 1916
 Glyphotaelius Stephens, 1833
 Grammotaulius Kolenati, 1848
 Halesochila Banks, 1907
 Hesperophylax Banks, 1916
 Lenarchus Martynov, 1914
 Lepnevaina Wiggins, 1987
 Leptophylax Banks, 1900
 Limnephilus Leach, 1815
 Nemotaulius Banks, 1906
 Philarctus McLachlan, 1880
 Platycentropus Ulmer, 1905
 Psychoronia Banks, 1916
 Rhadicoleptus Wallengren, 1891
 Rivulophilus Nishimoto, Nozaki, & Ruiter, 2001

References

Further reading

External links

 

Trichoptera tribes
Articles created by Qbugbot
Integripalpia